The Garden classification is a system of categorizing intracapsular hip fractures of the femoral neck. This fracture often disrupt the blood supply to the femoral head.

British orthopaedic surgeon  described a classification system for this type of fracture, referred to as the Garden classification and consisting of four grades:

Classification

Clinical relevance

The blood supply of the femoral head is much more likely to be disrupted in Garden types 3 or 4 fractures.
Surgeons may treat these types of fracture by replacing the fractured bone with a prosthesis arthroplasty.  Alternatively the treatment is to reduce the fracture (manipulate the fragments back into a good position) and fix them in place with metal screws.  Common practice is to repair Garden 1 and 2 fractures with screws, and to replace Garden 3 and 4 fractures with arthroplasty, except in young patients in whom screw repair is attempted first, followed by arthroplasty if necessary.  This is done in an effort to conserve the natural joint since prosthetic joints ultimately wear out and have to be replaced.
A serious but common complication of a fractured femoral neck is avascular necrosis. The vasculature to the femoral head is easily disturbed during fractures or from swelling inside the joint capsule. This can lead to strangulation of the blood supply to the femoral head and death of the bone and cartilage.

References

Hip fracture classifications